The Mahesh Memorial Public Higher Secondary School, Bagh, also known as MMPS BAGH is an English Medium, private co-educational secondary school institution affiliated with the Central Board of Secondary Education (CBSE), established in 1997.

References

External links
 

Private schools in Madhya Pradesh
High schools and secondary schools in Madhya Pradesh
Dhar district
Educational institutions established in 1997
1997 establishments in Madhya Pradesh